Cardinal Hume Catholic School is a coeducational secondary school and sixth form located in the Beacon Lough area of Gateshead, Tyne and Wear, England. It is named after Basil Cardinal Hume, a former President of the Catholic Bishops' Conference of England and Wales.

History
Previously a voluntary aided school administered by Gateshead Metropolitan Borough Council, Cardinal Hume Catholic School converted to academy status on 1 February 2012. The school is supported by the Roman Catholic Diocese of Hexham and Newcastle but coordinates with Gateshead Metropolitan Borough Council for admissions.

In July 2019, it was named as a computing hub for the National Centre for Computing Education.

Curriculum
Cardinal Hume Catholic School offers GCSEs and BTECs as programmes of study for pupils, while students in the sixth form have the option to study from a range of A-levels, Cambridge Technicals and further BTECs.

References

Academies in Gateshead
Catholic secondary schools in the Diocese of Hexham and Newcastle
Secondary schools in Gateshead